MacLinkPlus was a file format translation tool for classic Mac OS and PowerPC-era Mac OS X made by Dataviz. It was included by Apple on classic Mac OS until 1997. It could convert and open files created for another operating system, or by programs that may not be available on the user's computer. Thus, it could open a Word or Excel file even if Microsoft Office was not installed. MacLinkPlus supported, among others, word processing files, spreadsheet files, database programs and graphic formats.

Once installed, the application displayed an icon on the desktop onto which users could drag and drop their documents to have them converted.

This application is no longer sold by DataViz. Also, since the release of Mac OS X Lion, any application created for the PowerPC platform is no longer supported, and thus MacLinkPlus Deluxe will not open on this platform.

References

External links
MacLinkPlus Deluxe website (Internet Archive)

Utilities for macOS